Miss International 2004, the 44th Miss International pageant, was held on October 16, 2004 at the Workers Indoor Arena in Beijing, China. This is the first time event to be held in China for contest was being held outside of Japan and the United States are headquarter's homecountry. 58 contestants from all over the world competed for the crown. Miss International 2003, Goizeder Azua of Venezuela, crowned her successor Jeymmy Vargas of Colombia as the new Miss International.

Results

Placements
{| class="wikitable sortable" style="font-size:95%;"
|-
! Final results
! Contestant
|-
| Miss International 2004
|
  – Jeymmy Vargas
|-
| 1st Runner-Up
|
  – Amy Lynne Holbrook
|-
| 2nd Runner-Up
|
  – Olga Kypriotou
|-
| Top 15
|
  – Sun Yue
  – Lucie Degletagne
  – Natascha Borger
  – Mihika Verma
  – Tamiko Kawahara
  – Kim In-ha
  – Jeļena Keirāne
  – Sodtuya Chadraabal
  – Margaret Ann Bayot
  – Nataliya Kolodeznikova
  – Cristina Torres Domínguez
  – Laura Shields|}

Contestants

  – Telma de Jesus Esperanca Sonhi
  – Ysaura Giel
  – Lacey Davis
  – Shantell Nicole Hall
  – Vanessa Patricia Morón Jarzun
  – Grazielli Massafera
  – Adelynn Cupino
  – Francisca Valenzuela Rendic
  – Sun Yue
  – Jeymmy Vargas
  – Tatiana Vargas Cruz
  – Demetra Mouski
  – Michaela Wostlova
  – Carol M. Arciniegas
  – Irene Andrea Zunino Garcia
  – Dina Abel
  – Andrea Hernández
  – Helina Mezegbu
  – Henna Ylilauri
  – Lucie Degletagne
  – Natascha Vanessa Börger Sevilla
  – Olga Kypriotou
  – Kellie Peterson
  – Fu Sze-Sze
  – Blanka Bakos
  – Halldora Rut Bjarnadottir
  – Mihika Verma
  – Li’or Keren
  – Tamiko Kawahara (川原多美子)
  – Kim In-ha
  – Jeļena Keirāne
  – Nataly Nasrallah
  – Lim Lee Ching
  – Bernadette Gonzalez
  – Sodtuya Chadraabal
  – Yvana Parotu
  – Kenyelyn Litumular Arriola
  – Stephanie Eide Furuguiel
  – Anabella Isabel Hale Ruíz
  – Aldana Joyce García Jahnsen
  – Margaret Ann "Maan" Awitan Bayot
  – Marta Matyjasik
  – Meredith Herrera
  – Ramona-Angela Raut
  – Nataliya Kolodeznikova
  – Aminata Dieye
  – Jasna Bozovic
  – Sherry Ng Yun Feng
  – Aneta Kailingova
  – Cristina Torres Domínguez
  – Sunisa Pasuk
  – Rym Laalai
  – Gulsah Sahin
  – Yuliya Kumpan
  – Laura Shields
  – Amy Lynne Holbrook
  – Eleidy Aparicio
  – Cynthia Kanema

Notes

Did not compete

  – Farah Carisa Evans
  – Ene Maya Lawani
  – Myriam Raquel Rodriguez
  – Shehara Silva
 ''' – Tania Tinirauarii

References

External links
 Pageantopolis – Miss International 2004

2004
2004 in China
2000s in Beijing
2004 beauty pageants
Beauty pageants in China